White Knuckled Substance is the second album by Vendetta Red. It was released on October 30, 2001.

Critical reception
CMJ New Music Monthly wrote that the band "has managed to craft some unforgettably upbeat moments that elevate their emo-punk sound towards uninhibited sing-alongs."

Track listing
"Caught You Like A Cold" - 2:36
"Suicide Party" - 3:05
"Ribcage Menagerie" - 2:07
"Shatterday" - 2:39
"Accident Sex" - 3:12
"The Long Goodbye" - 4:11
"Stay Home" - 3:02
"Seconds Away" - 3:32
"All Cried Out" - 1:59
"Forgetiquette" - 2:36
"Por Vida" - 2:35
"Ambulance Chaser" - 3:03

References

Vendetta Red albums
2001 albums
Albums produced by Matt Bayles